Calavera (Spanish for skull) or its plural calaveras, may refer to:

Culture 
 Calaveras, any of various skull-shaped things associated with the 
 Literary Calavera, traditional Mexican composition in verse

Places 
 Calaveras River, in the Central Valley of California, USA
 Calaveras Creek (California), USA
 Calaveras County, California, USA
 Rancho Calaveras, California, USA
 Calaveras Dome, California, USA; a granite dome
 Cerro de la Calavera, Carlsbad, California, USA
 Calaveras Unified School District, Calaveras County, California, USA
 Calaveras Fault, a geological fault in the San Francisco Bay Area, California, USA
 Calaveras Valley, California, USA
 La Calavera Historical Neighborhood, Smeltertown, Texas, USA
 Calaveras, Texas, USA; a small town near San Antonio
 Calaveras Creek, Texas, USA
 Calaveras Lake (Texas), USA
 Isla Calavera, an island in the Gulf of California

Facilities and structures
 Calaveras Power Station, San Antonio, Texas, USA
 Calaveras Reservoir, California, USA
 Calaveras County Airport, Calaveras County, California, USA
 Calaveras station, BART, Silicon Valley, California, USA

People
 Jordi Calavera (born 1995) Spanish soccer player
 Calavera II, a former ring name for pro-wrestler luchador Jesús Javier Hernández Silva (1971–1993) aka Oro (wrestler)

Fictional characters
 Calaveras, a member of the Black Moon Clan, the primary villains in the Sailor Moon R manga and anime series
 Calaveras, the subordinates of the Arrancar Rudobone in the Bleach manga and anime series
 Francisca Calavera, titular character of the comic Calavera (comics)
 Manuel Calavera, the protagonist in the LucasArts 1998 adventure game, Grim Fandango
 Maria Calvera, a character from RWBY
 Robi Calavera, titular character of the animated series The Swashbuckling Adventures of Capitán Calavera

Other uses 
 El Calavera (film), 1954 Argentinian film
 Calavera (album), a 2001 album by 'Fiskales Ad-Hok'
 Calavera (comics), an adult comic featuring a female assassin with razor claws named Francisca Calavera
 Trío Calaveras, a Mexican musical trio

See also

 Siro calaveras (S. calaveras) a species of mite harvestman 
 "The Celebrated Jumping Frog of Calaveras County", a short story by Mark Twain
 Calavera Hills School, Carlsbad, California, USA
 Calaveras Hills High School, Milpitas, California, USA
 Calaveras Skull, a human skull discovered in Calaveras County
 Calaverite
 
 
 Calaveras Big Trees (disambiguation)
 Calaveras Lake (disambiguation)
 Skull (disambiguation)